Operation Junction City was an 82-day military operation conducted by United States and Republic of Vietnam (RVN or South Vietnam) forces begun on 22 February 1967 during the Vietnam War. It was the first U.S. combat airborne operation since the Korean War and one of the largest Airmobile operations of the war.

Background
The stated aim of the almost three-month operation involving the equivalent of nearly three divisions of U.S. troops was to locate the elusive 'headquarters' of the Communist uprising in South Vietnam, the Central Office of South Vietnam (COSVN). By some accounts of U.S. analysts at the time, such a headquarters was believed to be almost a "mini-Pentagon", complete with typists, file cabinets, and staff workers with a large guard force. After the end of the war, the actual headquarters was revealed by Viet Cong (VC) archives to be a small and mobile group of people, often sheltering in ad hoc facilities and at one point escaping an errant bombing by some hundreds of meters.

Junction City's grand tactical plan was a "hammer and anvil" tactic, with airborne forces "flushing out" the VC headquarters, driving it against a prepared "anvil" of other forces. The U.S. forces included most of the 1st Infantry Division and the 25th Infantry Division including the 196th Light Infantry Brigade, the airborne troops of the 173rd Airborne Brigade and large armored elements of the 11th Armored Cavalry Regiment (11th ACR).

Operation
II Field Force, Vietnam started the operation on 22 February 1967 (while Operation Cedar Falls was winding down). The initial operation was carried out by the 1st (commanded by Major General William E. DePuy) and the 25th (commanded by Major General Frederick C. Weyand) infantry divisions, who led their forces to the north of the operational area to build the "anvil" on which the VC 9th Division would be crushed. At the same time as the movement of infantry (eight battalions with 249 helicopters) 845 paratroopers of the 2nd Battalion, 503rd Infantry Regiment, 173rd Airborne Brigade conducted the only mass combat jump of the war and the largest since the Korean War.

At first the operations appeared to be succeeding, objectives were reached without encountering great resistance and on February 23, the mechanized forces 11th ACR and the 2nd Brigade, 25th Infantry Division, the "hammer" of armor struck against the '"anvil" of the infantry and airborne positioned north and west, giving the VC forces seemingly no chance to escape. The PAVN claim that on the first day of the operation they killed almost 200 U.S. troops, destroyed 16 armored vehicles and shot down 16 aircraft. The VC, highly mobile and elusive, with information sources deep in the South Vietnamese bureaucracy, had already moved their headquarters to Cambodia and launched several attacks to inflict losses and wear down the Americans. On February 28 and March 10 there were engagements with U.S. forces at the Battle of Prek Klok I and the Battle of Prek Klok II where the US, supported by powerful air strikes and massive artillery support repulsed VC attacks but the strategic result was disappointing.

On 18 March 1967, General Bruce Palmer Jr., new commander of II Field Force, Vietnam, after General Seaman, launched the second phase of Junction City, this time directly to the east by the mechanized divisions, the 1st Infantry Division and 11th ACR, reinforced this time from the 1st Brigade of the 9th Infantry Division. This maneuver gave rise to the toughest battle of the operation, the March 19 Battle of Ap Bau Bang II, where the VC 273rd Regiment put into difficulties the American armored cavalry, before being forced to retire by a huge amount of firepower.

The VC launched two more attacks in force, on March 21 and in Ap Gu on April 1, against the 1st and the 25th Infantry Division, both assaults were bloodily repulsed and the VC 9th Division came out seriously weakened, though still able to fight or retreat to safety in areas adjacent to the Cambodian border. On April 16 the U.S. command of II Field Force, in agreement with the MACV, decided to continue operations with a third phase of Operation Junction City. Until May 14 certain units of the 25th Infantry Division, undertook long and exhausting searches, advancing in the bush, raking villages and retrieving large amounts of materiel but with little contact with the VC units, now cautiously moved to a defensive footing.

Aftermath

Tay Ninh Province was picked over thoroughly and VC forces suffered significant losses, including large amounts of material captured: 810 tonnes of rice, 600 tonnes of small arms, 500,000 pages of documents. The American losses were not negligible, however, amounting to nearly 300 dead and over 1,500 injured.

According to calculations by the American command, the VC 9th Division was seriously weakened by the operations, suffering the loss of 2,728 killed, 34 captured men and 139 deserters. 100 crew-served weapons and 491 individual weapons were captured. The Vietnam Ministry of Defence in April 2017 claimed that they had suffered casualties of 10.2% (1275) of their total strength (15,000 men) with 1.7% (255) of total strength killed.

After the operations, the American forces were recalled to other areas of operation, and the country which was supposed to be in the firm control of the South Vietnamese government soon fell prey again to infiltration by the VC forces when they returned from their sanctuaries in Cambodia.

Allied intelligence later learned that as a result of the operation the VC moved most of their main force units across the border into Cambodia rather than stationing them in South Vietnam where they were more vulnerable to attack. The border sanctuaries in Cambodia which had previously been logistical areas were now expanded dramatically creating further tension between Cambodia and South Vietnam and its Allies.

When American troops found in some stores 120 reels of film and logistical equipment for the printing of documents, the command of MACV believed they had finally found the famous COSVN. However, the reality was very different. The mobile headquarters, commanded by some mysterious and famous personalities such as generals Thanh, Tran Van Tran and Do, had quickly retreated to Cambodia, maintaining its operations and confounding the hopes of the U.S. strategic planners.

With a huge consumption of resources and equipment, including 366,000 rounds of artillery and 3,235 tons of bombs, the American forces had inflicted losses on the communist forces and demonstrated the ability of airborne forces and even mechanized forces (also useful in impervious territory). Despite the tactical results, Junction City on an operational level had missed the most important objective as well as a failure to yield long term strategic leverage.

References

Further reading
 Summers, Harry G.  Historical Atlas of the Vietnam War. New York: Houghton Mifflin.
 
 
 Van, Dinh Thi, "I Engaged in Intelligence Work" The Gioi Publishers, Hanoi, 2006.

External links 
 Battlefield:Timeline, PBS
 After Action Report (Logistical)
 1/4 Cavalry After Action Report – JUNCTION CITY II – 26 Apr 67

Battles involving Vietnam
1967 in Vietnam
Battles involving the United States
Battles and operations of the Vietnam War in 1967
Junction City
History of Tây Ninh Province